The 1979 FIBA Under-19 World Championship (Portuguese: 1979 Campeonato Mundial FIBA Sub-19) was the maiden edition of the FIBA U19 World Championship. It was held in Salvador, Bahia, Brazil from 15 to 25 August 1979.

The United States notched their first-ever world juniors championship by sweeping both the preliminary round and the championship round, winning the Gold Medal against the hosts Brazil in the final day of the tournament, 75–55.

Preliminary round

Group A

Group B

Final round

Classification 7th–12th

Championship round

Final standings

Awards

References

External links
 Brazilian History
 USA history

FIBA Under-19 Basketball World Cup
1979 in basketball
1979 in Brazilian sport
International basketball competitions hosted by Brazil
August 1979 sports events in South America